Caronno Pertusella railway station is a railway station in Italy. It serves the town of Caronno Pertusella.

Services
Caronno Pertusella is served by the lines S1 and S3 of the Milan suburban railway network, operated by the lombard railway company Trenord.

See also
 List of Milan S Lines stations

References

External links
 Ferrovienord official site - Caronno Pertusella railway station 

Railway stations in Lombardy
Ferrovienord stations
Railway stations opened in 1879
Milan S Lines stations
1879 establishments in Italy
Caronno Pertusella
Railway stations in Italy opened in the 19th century